A by-election for the seat of New England in the New South Wales Legislative Assembly was held on 6 January 1871 because of the resignation of Charles Weaver to accept appointment as a police magistrate at Gosford.

Dates

Result

Charles Weaver resigned.

See also
Electoral results for the district of New England
List of New South Wales state by-elections

References

1871 elections in Australia
New South Wales state by-elections
1870s in New South Wales